The Woman in Black is a mystery novel by Zenith Jones Brown. It was first published in 1948 by Charles Scribner's Sons in the United States and by Collins Crime Club in England. It has been reprinted several times, including by Dell in 1957 and by Popular Library in 1963, and is available through Wildside Press as of 2017.

External links 
The Woman in Black at Kirkus Reviews
The Woman in Black entry at Pretty Sinister Books

1948 American novels
American mystery novels
Novels set in Washington, D.C.
Charles Scribner's Sons books
Collins Crime Club books